Lake Brown, officially known as Edgar Brown Lake, is a  fishing lake located in Barnwell County, South Carolina.

See also
List of lakes in South Carolina

External links
 Edgar Brown Lake - South Carolina Department of Natural Resources

Bodies of water of Barnwell County, South Carolina
Brown
Tourist attractions in Barnwell County, South Carolina